Jose Alfredo Morales Concua (born 3 December 1996) is a Guatemalan professional footballer who plays as a left-back for Liga Nacional club Municipal and the Guatemala national team.

Career
A youth product of Municipal, Morales began his career with them before moving to Deportivo Petapa. He followed that with stints at Naranjeros Escuintla and Deportivo Iztapa, before returning to Municipal on 4 June 2020.

International career
Morales was called up to represent the Guatemala national team at the 2021 CONCACAF Gold Cup. He debuted with Guatemala in a 2–0 Gold Cup loss to El Salvador on 12 July 2021.

International goals
Scores and results list Guatemala's goal tally first.

References

External links
 
 

1996 births
Living people
Sportspeople from Guatemala City
Guatemalan footballers
Guatemala international footballers
Association football fullbacks
C.S.D. Municipal players
Deportivo Petapa players
Liga Nacional de Fútbol de Guatemala players
2021 CONCACAF Gold Cup players